Anthony Alvin Steward II (born 13 October 1978 in Detroit, Michigan) is an  American professional basketball player who has played primarily in countries besides the United States. Steward is currently playing with Club julio de 9 in Argentina (TNA) league.

Career 

Steward played for East Catholic High School (Detroit) in Detroit, Michigan and graduated in 1996. He signed with the Xavier University of Louisiana and played there for two years before transferring to University of North Alabama where he was named Honorable Mention All Gulf South Conference Team 2000. 
The 6'7", 220 lbs[1] forward has played for Grand Rapids Hoops, Michigan Mayhem and Flint Fuze of the CBA, Fayetteville Patriots of the N.B.A. D- League, Texas Rimrockers of the U.S.B.L, New Jersey Squires and Tijuana Diablos of the A.B.A, Hoofdorp Challengers in the Netherlands, Mellilos del Sur (DOM-Puerto Plata), San Carlos (DOM-District National) and San Sebastian (DOM-Moca League) in Dominican Republic, Al Widhat in Jordan. He also was in workouts with the Toronto Raptors, Detroit Pistons and Cleveland Cavaliers training.

References
http://www.usbasket.com

1978 births
Living people
Basketball players from Detroit
Grand Rapids Hoops players
Michigan Mayhem players
Detroit East Catholic High School alumni
Fayetteville Patriots players
American expatriate basketball people in Argentina
American expatriate basketball people in the Dominican Republic
American expatriate basketball people in Jordan
American expatriate basketball people in the Netherlands
North Alabama Lions men's basketball players
Xavier Gold Rush basketball players
American men's basketball players